Shannon's Way is a 1948 novel by Scots author, A. J. Cronin.  It continues the story of Robert Shannon from Cronin's previous novel, The Green Years (1944).

Plot summary
Robert trains to be a doctor at the fictional Levenford Infirmary (Levenford is loosely based on Dumbarton), and falls in love with Jean Law, a young medical student belonging to the Plymouth Brethren who rejects him when she discovers that he has deceived her about his history and religion (he is a Roman Catholic).  He develops an interest in a disease contracted from infected cows' milk, and devotes his spare time to researching it: it turns out to be brucellosis.  Dr. Shannon  contracts a nervous breakdown when he completes the project only to find that someone else has anticipated his results, and is nursed by and marries Jean.

External links
Text of Shannon's Way

1948 British novels
Novels by A. J. Cronin
Medical novels
Medical romance novels
Scottish romance novels
Novels set in Scotland
Dumbarton
Victor Gollancz Ltd books
Little, Brown and Company books
British novels adapted into television shows
Ryerson Press books